791 Naval Air Squadron (791 NAS) was a Naval Air Squadron of the Royal Navy's Fleet Air Arm. It formed as an Air Target Towing Unit, at RNAS Arbroath, in Scotland, in October 1940. It operated various types of aircraft for target towing duties, used to support air gunnery training and practice. The squadron disbanded in December 1944, at Arbroath. It reformed at RNAS Trincomalee, in Sri Lanka, in November 1945, as a Fleet Requirements Unit. The squadron moved to RNAS Sembawang, in Singapore, in December 1945, ferried via HMS Smiter. It also operated a Communications Flight and an Air-Sea Rescue Flight, as well as undertaking anti Mosquito spraying duties. 791 NAS disbanded at Sembawang in June 1947.

History of 791 NAS

Air Target Towing Unit (1940 - 1944) 

791 Naval Air Squadron formed as an Air Target Towing Unit, on the 15 October 1940, at RNAS Arbroath, located near Arbroath in East Angus, Scotland. The squadron was initially equipped with two Roc, a carrier-based turret-armed fighter aircraft, for target towing.

It operated various types of aircraft while at Arbroath, in March 1941 Albacore single-engine biplane torpedo bomber aircraft, were received. One year on, in March 1942, the squadron started using Skua a Carrier-based dive bomber/fighter aircraft and Sea Gladiator single-seat fighter biplane aircraft, fitted with arrestor hooks, and these were followed by Swordfish biplane torpedo bomber aircraft in the April. October 1942 saw the arrival of Spitfire single-seat fighter aircraft to the squadron and one year later, in October 1943, Sea Hurricane single-seat fighter aircraft were received. By the end of that year the squadron received a later variant of Swordfish and in April 1944, it started using the TT III mark of Defiant, a dedicated turret-less target tug.

791 Naval Air Squadron disbanded as an Air Target Towing Unit, on the 10 December 1944, at RNAS Arbroath.

Fleet Requirements Unit (1945 - 1947) 

791 Naval Air Squadron reformed as a Fleet Requirements Unit, on the 1 November 1945, at RNAS Trincomalee (HMS Bambara), located in China Bay in eastern Sri Lanka. It was equipped with six Corsair, an American fighter aircraft, six Vengeance, an American dive bomber aircraft, and a single Harvard, an American single-engined advanced trainer aircraft. In December, the squadron moved to RNAS Sembawang, located at Sembawang, in the northern part of Singapore. They were joined by the Corsair, Vengeance and Harvard aircraft of 791 NAS. The two squadrons disembarked, from HMS Smiter, to RNAS Sembawang, on the 27 December 1945.

April 1946 saw the arrival of two Expediter, an American twin-engined light aircraft. These were followed by three Auster, British military liaison and observation aircraft, in the October. November 1946 saw the withdrawal of the Corsair aircraft, however, in December, two Seafire aircraft, a navalised version of the Spitfire, were received. The squadron also operated a Communications Flight and an Air-Sea Rescue flight. Australian Vengeance aircraft were acquired and used for DDT spraying against Mosquito flies.

791 Naval Air Squadron disbanded as a Fleet Requirements Unit, on the 16 June 1947, at RNAS Sembawang.

Aircraft flown 

791 Naval Air Squadron has flown a number of different aircraft types, including:

Blackburn Roc (Oct 1940 - Mar 1944)
Fairey Albacore (Mar 1941)
Blackburn Skua (Mar 1942 - Mar 1944)
Gloster Sea Gladiator (Mar 1942)
Fairey Swordfish I (Apr 1942 - Dec 1944)
Supermarine Spitfire Mk I (Oct 1942 - May 1943)
Hawker Sea Hurricane Mk IIC (Oct 1943)
Hawker Sea Hurricane Mk Mk IA (Dec 1943 - Jan 1944)
Hawker Sea Hurricane Mk Mk IB (Dec 1943 - Jan 1944)
Fairey Swordfish II (Dec 1943 - Jan 1944)
Boulton Paul Defiant TT Mk III (Apr 1944 - June 1944)
Vought Corsair Mk IV (Nov 1945 - Nov 1946)
Vultee Vengeance II (Dec 1945 - Dec 1946)
North American Harvard IIB (Dec 1945 - May 1947)
Vultee Vengeance IV (Dec 1945 - Dec 1946)
Beech Expediter (Apr 1946 - Apr 1947)
Taylorcraft Auster V (Oct 1946 - Jun 1947)
Supermarine Seafire F Mk XV (Dec 1946 - Jun 1947)

Naval Air Stations and Aircraft Carriers  

791 Naval Air Squadron operated from a number of naval air stations of the Royal Navy, both in the UK and overseas and a Royal Navy escort aircraft carrier:
Royal Navy Air Station ARBROATH (15 October 1940 - 10 December 1944)
Royal Naval Air Station TRINCOMALEE (1 November 1945 - 23 December 1945)
HMS Smiter (ferry) (23 December 1945 - 27 December 1945)
Royal Naval Air Station SEMBAWANG (27 December 1945 - 16 June 1947)

Commanding Officers 

List of commanding officers of 791 Naval Air Squadron with month and year of appointment and end:

1940 - 1944 
Lt-Cdr (A) L. Gilbert, RNVR (Oct 1940-Dec 1941)
Lt-Cdr (A) K.B. Brotchie, RNVR (Dec 1941-Sep 1942)
Lt J.C.M. Harman RN (Sep 1942-May 1943)
Lt-Cdr (A) C.A. Crighton, RNVR (May 1943-Apr 1944)
Lt-Cdr (A) A.P.T. Pierrsene, RNVR (Apr 1944-Dec 1944)
1945 - 1947
Lt-Cdr (A) C.M.T. Hallewell, RN (Nov 1945-Aug 1946)
Lt (A) R.A. Shilcock, RN (Aug 1946-Apr 1947)
LT (A) D.M. Jeram, RN (Apr 1947-Jun 1947)

References

Citations

Bibliography 
 

700 series Fleet Air Arm squadrons
Military units and formations established in 1940
Military units and formations of the Royal Navy in World War II